Robert R. Phillips (April 10, 1925 – November 5, 2018) was an American film and television actor.

Life and career 
Phillips was born in Chicago, Illinois. He was a self-defense instructor while serving in the United States Marine Corps, during World War II and later played football for the Chicago Bears and the Washington Redskins. Phillips was also a police officer in the Los Angeles Police Department and Illinois State Police. He was a personal bodyguard for the 31st Governor of Illinois, Adlai Stevenson II. Phillips began his film and television career in the 1950s, in which a film producer told him to become an actor.

Phillips attended an acting school. He retired from being a police officer in 1963. In his film and television career, Phillips was preferred as a "tough guy", for which he was frequently hired by studios to appear in Lee Marvin's films in Hollywood, California, including The Killers (1964) and Cat Ballou (1965). He also appeared in two films with actor Richard Jaeckel: The Gun Runners (1958) and The Dirty Dozen (1967). His other film roles included appearances in Dimension 5 (1966), Hour of the Gun (1967), Mackenna's Gold (1969), Slaughter (1972), The Slams (1973), I Escaped from Devil's Island (1973), The Dion Brothers (1974), Capone (1975, as Bugs Moran), Mitchell (1975), Mean Johnny Barrows (1975), The Killing of a Chinese Bookie (1976) and Walking Tall: Final Chapter (1977). Phillips also guest-starred in numerous television programs including Star Trek: The Original Series (in the episode "The Cage"), Gunsmoke, The Rockford Files, Bonanza, The Dukes of Hazzard, The Wild Wild West, Rawhide, Mission: Impossible, The High Chaparral, Mannix, The Fall Guy and Planet of the Apes. His last credit was for the western television series Bordertown.

Death 
Phillips died November 5, 2018, at the age of 93.

Filmography

References

External links 

Rotten Tomatoes profile

1925 births
2018 deaths
Male actors from Chicago
American male film actors
American male television actors
20th-century American male actors
American police officers
Players of American football from Chicago
Chicago Bears players
Washington Redskins players
Bodyguards
Los Angeles Police Department officers
United States Marine Corps personnel of World War II